B.C. Women's Hospital & Health Centre, an agency of the Provincial Health Services Authority (PHSA), is a Canadian hospital located in Vancouver, British Columbia, Canada, specializing in women's health programs. It is the only facility in Western Canada dedicated to the health of women, newborns and families, and is the largest maternity hospital in the country. It is a teaching hospital and major provincial health care resource, and is a key component in women's health research.

BC Women's employs more than 1,000 full and part-time staff. More than 450 doctors work at the hospital.

History 
The former Salvation Army Grace Maternity Hospital, has been caring for BC families starting in 1927 at its original location at Heather Street and West 29th Avenue.  Both Grace Hospital and Vancouver General Hospital's Willow Pavilion Maternity care moved to the current location at 4500 Oak Street in 1982 and shared the campus with BC Children's Hospital and Shaughnessy Hospital. It provides health services that address the health needs of women of all ages and backgrounds. Women's is the largest maternity hospital in Canada with over 7,000 babies delivered every year. Women's provides a combination of acute care services such as HIV/AIDS care and treatment, abortion, and sexual assault services, for women throughout the province (through outreach and on-site services in Vancouver) and basic health care services such as breast health checks for women in the Lower Mainland. It provides training for providers across the province.

Following the closure of Shaughnessy Hospital in 1993, The Salvation Army withdrew administration in 1994 and the facility was renamed BC Women's Hospital & Health Centre. Under the Provincial Health Services Authority, BC Women's Hospital & Health Centre has a mandate to serve women, babies and their families across B.C. Only 43 percent of patients reside in the Lower Mainland, while 57 per cent of patients live in other areas of B.C. With many specialized women's health services not available anywhere else in the province, BC Women's treats over 68,000 patients each year.

On October 25, 2006, Felicia Simms delivered conjoined twins (Krista and Tatiana Hogan) at BC Women's Hospital & Health Centre. They are believed to be the first ever conjoined twins born in British Columbia.

Canada's first set of sextuplets, four boys and two girls, were born at the hospital on January 6 and 7, 2007. They were in the 25th week of gestation when born, or approximately 3 months premature.

In 2014, construction began on the new Teck Acute Care Centre, a $676 million project in three phases to build "an eight-storey facility, approximately 59,400 square metres (640,000 square feet) in size. The facility was designed to Leadership in Energy and Environmental Design (LEED) Gold standard and include extensive use of wood, consistent with the Province of B.C.'s Wood First Act." The building "will be a bright, modern facility with single-occupant patient rooms, access to natural light and gardens. It includes...a high-risk labour and delivery suite and a new neonatal intensive care unit for BC Women's Hospital + Health Centre." On October 29, 2017 The Teck Acute Care Centre, which had been built by Balfour Beatty, was officially opened.

In September 2020, 10 new single room birthing suites were opened, bringing the total of single room birthing suites to 27. These new rooms are part of an expansion of BC Women’s Cedar Birthing Suites, which also includes a new family lounge where family members and visitors can relax and wait, and where siblings can play.

Specializations and services 
Its specialists and staff:
deliver approximately 7,200 babies per year
provide high risk maternity care (1200 high risk premature + sick newborns in Neonatal Intensive Care annually)
operate with 85 antepartum/postpartum beds, including 29 high risk beds, plus 9 delivery suites and 10 neonatal care nursery beds
support low-risk mothers and families in 7 new single room maternity care rooms
provide care for more than 42,500 in-patients visits each year
see patients 24/7 at the Urgent Care Centre (pregnant women who are registered to deliver here, or who have delivered and up to six weeks post-birth

As a health centre, BC Women's provides care and treatment to over 19,000 outpatients each year through women's health services including:
Maternity Ambulatory Program
Provincial Milk Bank (serves 1200 high risk premature and sick newborns in neonatal ICU care annually)
The Oak Tree Clinic: Women & Children with HIV/AIDS
Breast Health Program
Reproductive Health
Heartwood Centre — A 27-bed residential addiction treatment & rehab program
Aboriginal Health Program
Sexual Assault Program
Continence Program
Midwifery Program
Integrated Gynecological Surgical Daycare

The Foundation 
BC Women's Health Foundation supports the capital equipment, diagnostic, patient care, research and education needs of the hospital and health centre through fund-raising, planned giving and corporate partnerships.
Aurora Centre closed in August 2011. There is a new Heartwood program in its place.

Women's Health Research Institute at BC Women's 
In March 2005, the Women’s Health Research Institute (WHRI) was established by BC Women’s Hospital + Health Centre to enhance and galvanize the impact of women’s health research conducted at BC Women’s and throughout BC. A leading academic women’s and newborn health research centre embedded within the hospital. WHRI is devoted to improving the health and health care of girls and women through knowledge generation, serving as a catalyst for research in women’s health and supporting an expanding provincial and national network of women’s health researchers, policy makers and healthcare providers.

References

External links
 Official website
 BC Women's Hospital & Health Centre Foundation
 Women's Health Research Institute at BC Women's

Buildings and structures in Vancouver
Hospitals in British Columbia
Maternity hospitals
Hospitals established in 1927
Heliports in Canada
Women in British Columbia
Certified airports in British Columbia
1927 establishments in British Columbia
Maternity in Canada